The following are the national records in athletics in Botswana maintained by its national athletics federation: Botswana Athletics Association (BAA).

Outdoor

Key:

h = hand timing

A = affected by altitude

Men

Women

Mixed

Indoor

Men

Women

Notes

References
General
World Athletics Statistic Handbook 2019: National Outdoor Records
World Athletics Statistic Handbook 2018: National Indoor Records
Specific

Botswana
Records
Athletics